This is an overview of the progression of the Olympic track cycling record of the men's 1 km time trial as recognised by the Union Cycliste Internationale (UCI).

The track time trial was already at the 1896 Summer Olympics, but it was the only time the event was held over one-third of a kilometre rather than one kilometer. The men's 1 km time trial was introduced at the 1928 Summer Olympics and was discontinued after the 2004 Summer Olympics. Strangely, the list of Olympic records from the UCI starts in 1980.

Progression

* Not listed by the UCI as an Olympic record

References

Track cycling Olympic record progressions